Esther Liu (born 8 August 1988) is a Taiwanese actress, singer and television host.

Liu began her career at the age of 14 as part of the girl group Sweety with Joanne Tseng. In 2003, Liu made her acting debut in the television series Westside Story alongside Tony Sun and Wallace Huo. Since then, she has starred in several drama series including Chinese Paladin (2005), Green Forest, My Home (2005), The Concerto (2009), Falling (2013), Thirty Something (2015) and Light the Night (2021).

Filmography

Television series

Film

Variety show

Music video appearances

Theater

Discography

Studio albums

Published works

Awards and nominations

References

External links

 
 
 

1988 births
Living people
21st-century Taiwanese actresses
21st-century Taiwanese singers
Taiwanese film actresses
Taiwanese television actresses
Taiwanese television presenters
21st-century Taiwanese women singers
Taiwanese women television presenters